Leşkər (also, Ləşkər and Leshker) is a village in the Gadabay Rayon of Azerbaijan.  The village forms part of the municipality of Kiçik Qaramurad.

References 

Populated places in Gadabay District